Christopher North Renquist (born February 6, 1969), known professionally as Christopher North, is an American composer, songwriter, and multi-instrumentalist musician. Working most notably as a film composer, he has also composed and written for orchestra, theater, dance, and children's television. North has played in Broadway theater as a bassist and guitarist.

Biography
Born Christopher North Renquist in Austin, Texas on February 6, 1969, Christopher North is a multi-instrumental composer and singer-songwriter based in New York City. As a composer his works have been performed at venues in Europe (London, Berlin and Edinburgh) and the US (Texas, California, Illinois, Ohio, Hawaii and New York) including collaborations with filmmakers (Tribeca, Big Apple and SXSW Film Festivals), theater companies (including Workshop Theater, NY and Edinburgh Fringe), choreographers (Wave Hill, Joyce SOHO) and concerts including the 92nd Street Y. His children's songs can be heard on the Disney Channel and Noggin, where he wrote songs for Oobi.

As a genre-crossing musician, North has performed and recorded with an eclectic array of artists and ensembles. He has played bass with Quincy Jones, the Dixie Chicks, Rosanne Cash, various symphony orchestras as well on Broadway in The Lion King and Spring Awakening. He has sung with the New York Philharmonic (including the 3 Grammy Award-winning John Adams' "On the Transmigration of Souls") and for Stephen Sondheim ("Frogs" with Nathan Lane). He has performed at venues including Lincoln Center, Carnegie Hall, CBGB's and Madison Square Garden. He has performed on national TV (including Live with Regis and Kelly and Live at Lincoln Center), and been heard on the radio (NPR, WNYC) and commercials (including Visa and Tide). He has recorded and performed extensively as a multi-instrumentalist (guitar, keyboards, harmonica, etc.) As a multi-instrumentalist, he plays traditional instruments as well as newly created boutique instruments, including the Marcodi Harpejji, the Guitarviol, the Slaperoo, the Suzuki Andes 25, bass Ukulele, Cello Banjo, a ROLI Rise, and a Veillette Gryphon. He has produced and released two albums, Opus Zero, a classical album featuring chamber music and art songs, and De La Sur, an eclectic rock/soul album. He has done sound design and music for The Forever Waltz by Glyn Maxwel, the score for Angelica Torn's Lucky Days and various projects with writer and director Matthew Miele, finishing the feature-length film Everything's Jake in 2006 and Eavesdrop in September 2007. His scores and albums feature world-class NYC musicians (Eroica Trio, Ethel (string quartet), Andy Middleton, Carol Emanuel).

Works/Recordings/Performances

Film Scores
Cracked Up: The Darrell Hammond Story – A film by Michelle Esrick, starring Darrell Hammond as himself in which Christopher North provided guitarviol bookend cues
Lp - A crime short by Alexander Etseyatse
Capturing the Flag – A film by Anne de Mare documenting vote registration
Otis - A TV Series by Alexander Etseyatse in which North composed music for the episode Six Months Earlier
Stopwatch -  A short drama film by Alexander Etseyatse
Cut Shoot Kill – A horror film by Michael Walker in which North composed much of his scores using the waterphone
Addict – A short film by Steve Curley with an ambient score
The Bell - A thriller short by Jeremy Merrifield
Two Trains Runnin''' – A Grammy nominated film (Best Original Music) directed by Samuel D. Pollard and written by Benjamin Hedin. North attended the Newport Folk Festival where he performed themes from the filmDark Passenger: Volume 1 - A horror film involving six stories that center around characters dealing with their personal demonsThe Flip - A drama short by Chung LamThe Break In - A horror short by Marcus SlabineA New High  – A documentary film about homelessness and drug addiction directed by Samuel Miron and Stephen Scott ScapullaMissing People - A crime documentary by David ShapiroAll in Time – A drama film by Christopher Fetchko and Marina DonahueKarl Manhair, Postal Inspector - A TV series in which North composed music for 6 episodes; Man Is a Bad Animal, The Dark Arts, Family Business, Sisyphus, Some Sort of Sex Thing, Be the LionThink Ink – A short film directed by Wally Chung and story by Emily Hu which was awarded the Spirit of Slamdance at the Slamdance FestivalThe Bear - A drama short by Rachael SonnenbergF(l)ag Football – A film by Seth Greenleaf starring Wade Davis, Jared Garduno, Brenton Metzler, Cyd ZeiglerInseparable - A drama short by Eran EvronSky of the Damned – A TV series by Tasmin L. Silver in which North composed music for 5 episodes; Wake, Jillian, The FAE, Welcome to My City, Back to the StartBird Song - A drama short by Rachael Sonnenberg and Max SternL'Absinthe - A drama/thriller by Olivier BertinPowerless - A documentary short by Adam Lawrence and Shayok MukhopadhyayBible Quiz – A film by Nicole Teeny which opened at the 2013 Slamdance Film Festival. North's score features marimba, harpsichord, organ, guitar, percussion, glockenspiel, whistling, and various glass soundsFour One Nine -  A drama short by Alexander EtseyatseMove – A documentary by Theodore CollatosGoodbye Brooklyn - A drama short by Jon-Carlos EvansHouston & 6th - A thriller short by Nyle Cavazos GarciaOpen Call - A comedy short by Geoff LererThe 5Boroughs - A comedy/drama short by Nyle Cavazos GarciaThe Man with the Red Right Hand -  A comedy/thriller short by Nyle Cavazos GarciaPut It in Your Box -  A comedy short by Matthew D'AbateS&M -  A short thriller film by Matthew D'AbateWerewolf - A horror short by Matthew D'AbateBemvindo – A short film by Alexander RojoCase Closed - A comedy/drama short by Kevin StocklinGiant Place Detail – A documentary by Diana Quinones RiveraMary's Journal: Episode 1 – Connected - A short horror/mystery film by Nyle Cavazos GarciaAbidjan - A short film by Alexander Etseyatse, premiering at 24 film festivalsEavesdrop: A Conversation with Writer/Director Matthew Miele - A video documentary short about the filming of Eavesdrop (2008)Cut - A short horror film by Matthew D'AbateHeart – A short drama film by Hugh PlantinBrother's Reaction - A short drama film by Eddie GriffithNutmeg - A comedy short by Amy BenaroyaEavesdrop – A film by Matthew Miele starring Chris Parnell, Tovah Feldshuh, Terennce MannThe Dark - A short horror film and another collaboration with filmmaker Nyle Cavazos GarciaLucky Days – A film by Angelica Torn starring actor/writer/director Angelica Torn, Luke Zarzecki, co-director Tony Torn, Rip Torn, Federico CastelluccioEverything's Jake – A film by Matthew Miele starring Ernie Hudson, score performed by composer (with string quartet and saxophone) distributed by Warner BrothersSkips – A short film by Steve Curley, guitar and percussion score (2003) official entry in 2003 Tribeca Film FestivalHumidity – A short thriller film by Nyle Cavazos GarciaThe Tip (1997) – Multi-tracked double bass and piano score for short film produced and directed by Kahvan Mashayekh premiered at the Independent Film Festival, Houston, Texas, official entry in the 1998 SXSW Film Festival in Austin, TX and in the 1998 Houston International Film Festival

Music for DanceFerrum (2015) a Site-Specific Project at Pioneer Works (also played at Roulette) that draws on the historical, industrial components of the Pioneer space. The project was commissioned by Carte Blanche Shandoah, Brooklyn NYVictorian Hypnosis at The Salon Mexicana (2015) immersive performance in collaboration with Atlas Obscura commissioned by Carte Blanche Shandoah in ACME Studios, Brooklyn NYNEIL (2014) site-specific performance at New York Transit Museum's Inaugural Platform series commissioned by Carte Blance Shandoah, New York NYSuddenly Green (1998) for recorder, guitar, and percussion (one musician / dancer performed by the composer) commissioned by the Field and choreographer Sherry Greenspan for the Dancing in the Streets Festival at Wave Hill, Bronx NY
 Seuss Suites (1998) multi-instrumental score/sound design for dance commissioned by Valerie Alpert and Company, Columbus OH
 I Take Nights in the Middle of my Walk (1997–1998) for double bass, guitar and percussion (one musician / dancer performed by the composer) commissioned by choreographer Sherry Greenspan, presented at Joyce Theater Soho, NYC
 What Are You Afraid Of? (1997) multi-instrumental score/sound design commissioned by Valerie Alpert and Company, Columbus OH
 Seed (1995) for violin, multi-media collaboration with choreographer Michelle Lee Adams for performance by New Arts Collective, Dallas TX

Classical/Orchestral composition
 Opus Zero (2002) by Christopher North, 13-track self-produced CD (including art song, chamber music, solo pieces)
 Renquist (2007) by Christopher North, 15-track self-produced compilation of 1988–1998 works (including art song, chamber music, solo works, electronic soundscapes for dance)
 Many new chamber works and Art songs for a Distinguished Artist recitals at the 92nd St Y in February 2001 and February 2008.

Jazz Composition
 15 original jazz tunes composed for Eavesdrop score. Seven premiered live at February 2008 92nd Street Y recital.

Music/Sound Design for Theater
 The Forever Waltz (2005) Original music and sound design for the Glyn Maxwell Play (including "the feather lake song" with words by the poet) produced by Verse Theater Manhattan / Workshop Theater in NYC and produced by Restricted View in London and Presented at Edinburgh Fringe 2005, directed by Elysa Marden
 The Three Musketeers (1998) score/sound design for the play commissioned (with Meet the Composer) by The American Globe Theater, NYC
 The Husbands (world premiere in August 1998 at the New York International Fringe Festival) live score/sound design (one musician) for the Christopher Logue play, directed by Elysa Marden, produced by Richard Ryan / Verse Productions

Songwriter
 Songs for Sesame Street International, Disney Channel and Noggin Network for Josh Selig / Little Airplane Productions.
 Christopher North, de la sur (2002), 17-track self-produced CD
 Blue Skye, Yesterday's Yesteryear Blues (1994) 10-track self-produced CD

Bassist – Broadway/Theater
 The Lion King on Broadway, New York NY (August 2001 – 2011) substitute player for Tom Barney
 Spring Awakening on Broadway, New York NY (January 2007 – January 2009) substitute player for George Farmer
 Rent on Broadway, New York NY (January 2004 – January 2005) substitute player for Steve Mack

Guitarist – Broadway/Theater
 The Lion King on Broadway, New York NY (December 2004 – 2011) substitute player for Kevin Kuehn, the chair requires guitar (electric and classical), ukulele and kalimba

Vocal Recordings – Solo/Ensemble
 Various demo and jingle recordings, New York, NY (1997–present) inc. Disney International and Sesame Street
 John Adams' "On the Transmigration of Souls", for Nonesuch Records with the New York Philharmonic / New York Choral Artists, winner of 3 Grammy Awards (2005)
 Stephen Sondheim's "The Frogs / Evening Primrose" (2000) for Nonesuch Records, featured Nathan Lane at the Hit Factory
 Alice Parker "My Love and I", (2000) Men's choral works from the Robert Shaw / Alice Parker catalog for Melodius Accord at Riverside Church
 "Kurt Masur at the New York Philharmonic," 10-CD box set features New York choral artists

As Multi-Instrumentalist
 Christopher North's De la Sur' (2002), vocals, acoustic and electric basses, acoustic and electric guitars, drums / percussion, keyboards, sitar, recorder, harmonica.
 Enid Levine and the Boys, Take This Show on the Road (2000), Acoustic /electric /fretless bass, nylon, steel and 12 string guitar, harmonica, vocals
 Blue Skye, Yesterday's Yesteryear Blues (1995) Singer-songwriter, bass, keys, guitar & mixing
Numerous soundtracks: Cut Shoot Kill, Two Trains Runnin', L'Absinthe

Producer – Children's Songs

Educator – Bass/Guitar, Private/Studio/School Instruction
 Private Studio, Denton and Dallas TX, New York and Brooklyn NY (1990 to present)
 92nd Street Y, New York NY (1997–present)

Education 

 Bachelor of Music in Music Composition – Southern Methodist University (1992–1994)
 University of North Texas (1987–1991)

References

External links
 Christopher North's official website
 
 Eavesdrop film official website
 Everything's Jake official website
Christopher North's Youtube channel

1969 births
American film score composers
Living people
Musicians from Austin, Texas
American male film score composers